Hempsted Court was a country house at Hempsted near Gloucester in England. It was the home of the Lysons family. It was demolished in 1962 and replaced by a housing estate.

See also
 Bristol Road

References

External links 

Country houses in Gloucestershire
Buildings and structures demolished in 1962
1962 disestablishments in England
Lysons family